The Laschet cabinet was the state government of North Rhine-Westphalia between 2017 and 2021, sworn in on 30 June 2017 after Armin Laschet was elected as Minister-President of North Rhine-Westphalia by the members of the Landtag of North Rhine-Westphalia. It was the 24th Cabinet of North Rhine-Westphalia.

It was formed after the 2017 North Rhine-Westphalia state election by the Christian Democratic Union (CDU) and Free Democratic Party (FDP). Excluding the Minister-President, the cabinet comprised twelve ministers. Eight were members of the CDU, three were members of the FDP, and one was an independent politician.

After Laschet's resignation as Minister-President, the Laschet cabinet was succeeded by the Wüst cabinet on 28 October 2021.

Formation 

The previous cabinet was a coalition government of the Social Democratic Party (SPD) and The Greens led by Minister-President Hannelore Kraft.

The election took place on 14 May 2017, and resulted in substantial losses for both governing parties. The opposition CDU and FDP both recorded gains, with the former becoming the largest party. The AfD debuted at 7%.

Overall, the incumbent coalition lost its majority. The opposition coalition of the CDU and FDP won a slim majority of one seat. Also considered was a grand coalition of the CDU and SPD, but the SPD rejected this the day after the election. CDU leader Armin Laschet initially announced plans to held exploratory talks with the SPD, FDP, and Greens, but only the FDP accepted the offer.

On 22 May, the CDU and FDP boards unanimously voted to begin negotiations for a coalition. Meetings began the following day. They presented their coalition agreement in mid-June. The FDP held an online membership ballot to review the pact, with 97% voting in favour on about 50% turnout. The CDU congress unanimously approved the contract the next day, and it was formally signed on 26 June.

Laschet was elected as Minister-President by the Landtag on 27 June, winning 100 votes out of 196 cast. His cabinet was sworn in on 30 June.

Composition

External links

References 

Politics of North Rhine-Westphalia
State governments of Germany
Cabinets established in 2017
2017 establishments in Germany
Cabinets of North Rhine-Westphalia
2021 disestablishments in Germany
Cabinets disestablished in 2021